Kateh-ye Khafr, also known as Kat-e Khafr, may refer to:
 Kateh-ye Khafr-e Olya
 Kateh-ye Khafr-e Sofla